Meagan Duhamel (born December 8, 1985) is a Canadian pair skater. With partner Eric Radford, she is a two-time world champion (2015, 2016), a 2018 Olympic gold medallist in the team event, a 2014 Olympic silver medallist in the team event, a 2018 Olympic bronze medallist in the pairs event, a two-time Four Continents champion (2013, 2015), the 2014–15 Grand Prix Final champion, and a seven-time Canadian national champion (2012–18).

During the 2014 Olympics, Duhamel and Radford became the first pair to land a side-by-side triple Lutz jump at any Winter Olympic competition.

At the 2018 Winter Olympics, 32-year-old Duhamel won a gold medal as part of the figure skating team event, becoming one of the oldest Olympic champions in figure skating. Three days later, during the individual pairs free skate, Duhamel and Radford became the first team to complete a quadruple throw jump at any Winter Olympic competition when she landed their throw quadruple Salchow.

With previous partner Craig Buntin, Duhamel became the 2010 Four Continents bronze medallist and a three-time Canadian national medallist (one silver, two bronze).

Duhamel and her previous partner, Ryan Arnold, were the first pair to land a side-by-side triple Lutz jump in competition, which they did at the 2005 Canadian Championships. At the 2005 World Junior Figure Skating Championships, they became the first team to land a throw triple Lutz jump in international competition.

Personal life
Meagan Duhamel was born on December 8, 1985, in Sudbury, Ontario, and raised in the Lively neighbourhood. She is of Finnish descent on her mother's side and French on her father's, Duhamel is an old French surname meaning "Of the Hamlet", implying her French ancestors were from a small farming village. She is studying holistic health. She became a vegan in December 2008. In July 2014, it was publicly announced that she was engaged to her coach Bruno Marcotte. The couple married on June 5, 2015 in Bermuda. Their daughter Zoey was born October 25, 2019. Duhamel and Marcotte welcomed another daughter, Miya, on July 14, 2022. 

In August 2018, Greater Sudbury City Council renamed the street in Lively that Duhamel grew up on in her honour.

Skating career

Early career
Duhamel began skating when she was three years old, in 1988. At age 14, she moved to Barrie, Ontario to train at the Mariposa School of Skating.

Duhamel competed in both singles and pairs for several years. She teamed up with Ryan Arnold in the spring of 2004. They were the first skaters to land a side-by-side triple Lutz jump in competition, which they did at the 2005 Canadian Championships. At the 2005 World Junior Figure Skating Championships, they became the first team to land a throw triple Lutz jump in international competition. They ended their partnership in March 2006. Duhamel had a stress fracture and was off the ice for four months. She withdrew from both her Grand Prix events due to injury. She competed at the 2007 Canadian Championships and placed sixth; it was the last time she competed as a single skater. She was coached by Lee Barkell.

Partnership with Buntin
In June 2007, Duhamel moved to Montreal and teamed up with Craig Buntin. In January 2008, the pair won the bronze medal at the Canadian Nationals but during the exhibition Buntin injured his shoulder, with which he had previous problems, as a result of a timing issue. They missed the Four Continents but competed at the 2008 World Championships in Sweden on March 19, 2008, despite the shoulder still being a problem, and finished 6th. However, their participation aggravated Buntin's injury, tearing the rotator cuff, the labrum and three tendons; he had surgery in April and the recovery took seven to eight months. They could not practice lifts until two weeks before 2008 Skate America so they worked on adding variations to their elements, such as a spread eagle entrance into a lift and a death spiral with the opposite hand.

In November 2008, during the long program at the Trophée Eric Bompard, Duhamel accidentally sliced Buntin's hand a minute into the program, on their side-by-side salchow jumps, and blood dripped onto the ice; the pair stopped to get his hand bandaged and then resumed the program to win the bronze medal.
In July 2010, Buntin announced his retirement from competitive figure skating. Having experienced two stress fractures, a bulging disc in her back, and a nerve dysfunction in her leg, Duhamel also considered retiring but soon decided to continue competing.

2010–2011 season: First season with Radford 
At a coach's suggestion, Duhamel had a tryout with Eric Radford and they decided to compete together. They won a silver medal at the 2011 Canadian Championships and were assigned to the 2011 Four Continents Championships and the 2011 World Championships. At Four Continents, the pair won a silver medal.

During the short program at the 2011 World Championships, Radford's nose was broken when Duhamel's elbow hit him on the descent from a triple twist, their first element – she opened up too early. Seeing the blood, Duhamel suggested they stop but he decided to continue and they finished the program without a pause. Duhamel had not done a triple twist since 2005, and the new pair only began performing it before the Canadian Championships.

2011–2012 season
Duhamel/Radford won bronze medals at their Grand Prix events, the 2011 Skate Canada and 2011 Trophée Eric Bompard. They won their first national title and finished 5th at the 2012 World Championships.

2012–2013 season
The next season, Duhamel/Radford won silver at their Grand Prix events, the 2012 Skate Canada International and 2012 Trophée Eric Bompard. They then won their second national title and their first Four Continents title. Duhamel/Radford stepped onto the World podium for the first time at the 2013 World Championships in London, Ontario, where they won the bronze medal.

2013–2014 season
Duhamel/Radford skated their short program to music composed by Radford. During the 2014 Olympics, Duhamel and Radford became the first pair team to land a side-by-side triple Lutz at any Winter Olympic competition. After finishing seventh at the 2014 Winter Olympics in Sochi, they returned to the podium at the 2014 World Championships, where they scored personal bests in both the short program and the free skate on their way to a second bronze medal.

2014–2015 season
Duhamel/Radford practiced a quad throw Salchow during the summer of 2014. At the inaugural 2014 Autumn Classic International held in Barrie, Ontario, they successfully executed the quad throw Salchow and won the event. They were chosen to compete at the 2014 Skate Canada International and 2014 NHK Trophy in the 2014–15 Grand Prix season. They won both events and eventually won their first Grand Prix Final title. At the Grand Prix Final, they improved their personal best scores in the free skating and combined total.
They continued their first place streak by winning their fourth Canadian title and their second Four Continents title. In March 2015, they won gold in pairs at the 2015 World Championships, capping a perfect season in which they won gold at every international event where they competed.

2015–2016 season
Duhamel/Radford began their season by winning the 2015 Skate Canada Autumn Classic. Turning to the Grand Prix series, they won gold medals at the 2015 Skate Canada International and 2015 NHK Trophy. In December, they took silver behind Stolbova/Klimov at the Grand Prix Final in Barcelona.

In January 2016, Duhamel/Radford won their fifth consecutive national title, at the Canadian Championships. They withdrew from the 2016 Four Continents Championships in Taipei due to Duhamel's illness. In April, they competed at the 2016 World Championships in Boston, placing second in the short and first in the free. They were awarded the gold medal ahead of Sui/Han and Savchenko/Massot, who took silver and bronze respectively.

2016–2017 season
Duhamel/Radford received the bronze medal at the Grand Prix Final in December 2016 before winning their sixth consecutive national title. In January 2017. In February, they took the silver medal behind Sui/Han at the 2017 Four Continents Championships. At the 2017 World Championships, held in March in Helsinki, Finland, Radford had trouble training due to a muscle spasm in his hip. The pair finished 7th at the competition.

2017–2018 season
Duhamel/Radford began their final competitive season with silver at the 2017 CS Autumn Classic. Switching to the Grand Prix series, the pair took gold at the 2017 Skate Canada International after ranking second in the short program and first in the free skate. At the 2017 Skate America, they received the bronze medal after ranking first in the short and third in the free. Their scores at their two Grand Prix events qualified the pair to compete at the 2017–18 Grand Prix Final, held in December in Nagoya, Japan. They climbed from fifth after the short to obtain the bronze medal at the final.

In January, Duhamel/Radford won their seventh consecutive Canadian pairs' title, an all-time record, at the 2018 Canadian National Championships. In February, they represented Canada at their second Winter Olympics, which took place in PyeongChang, South Korea. Competing in the team event, they placed second in the short program, and first in the free skate, contributing to Canada's team gold medal. At 32 and 33 years old respectively, they were among the oldest Olympic champions in figure skating. They were the only top pair to skate both segments of the team competition, as individual pairs was to take place first of the individual figure skating events. In the individual event, Duhamel/Radford ranked third in the short program and second in the free skate, finishing in third place and earning the bronze medal. They became the first pair to complete a throw quad at any Winter Olympic competition.

On April 25, the two announced their retirement from competition. Duhamel expressed interest in becoming a technical specialist.

Post-competitive career 

In spring of 2019, it was announced that Duhamel would move to Oakville, Ontario to coach at the Skate Oakville Skating Club with husband, Bruno Marcotte. She is currently part of the coaching team of the Japanese pair team Riku Miura / Ryuichi Kihara.

Duhamel competed on the sixth season of the CBC series Battle of the Blades, partnered with retired NHL player Wojtek Wolski. Inspired by her own daughter Zoey's need for neonatal intensive care following birth, Duhamel competed on behalf of the Sandra Schmirler Foundation. Duhamel and Wolski won the contest.

In the spring of 2021, it was announced that Radford would be returning to competition with a new partner, Vanessa James. Duhamel stated that she and Radford had had a verbal agreement to continue doing show skating, which had included shows being arranged while he was trying out with James, and that she felt "blindsided" by the news. In May, Duhamel announced a return to the fall tour of Stars on Ice, in which she would perform with former domestic rival Dylan Moscovitch.

Programs

With Radford

With Buntin

With Arnold

Singles career

Competitive highlights
GP: Grand Prix; CS: Challenger Series; JGP: Junior Grand Prix

Pairs with Radford

Pairs with Buntin

Pairs with Arnold

Ladies' singles

Detailed results
Small medals for short and free programs awarded only at ISU Championships. At team events, medals awarded for team results only.

(with Radford)

References

External links

! colspan="3" style="border-top: 5px solid #78FF78;" |World Junior Records Holder

1985 births
Canadian female single skaters
Canadian female pair skaters
Canadian people of Finnish descent
Canadian people of French descent
Living people
Sportspeople from Greater Sudbury
Four Continents Figure Skating Championships medalists
World Figure Skating Championships medalists
Figure skaters at the 2014 Winter Olympics
Figure skaters at the 2018 Winter Olympics
Olympic figure skaters of Canada
Medalists at the 2014 Winter Olympics
Medalists at the 2018 Winter Olympics
Olympic medalists in figure skating
Olympic gold medalists for Canada
Olympic silver medalists for Canada
Skating people from Ontario
Olympic bronze medalists for Canada
Season-end world number one figure skaters
Season's world number one figure skaters